Queen Bess can refer to:

 Elizabeth I (1533–1603), Queen of England and Ireland
 Bessie Coleman (1892–1926), an early American civil aviator
 Queen Bess, Scunthorpe, a pub in England
 Queen Bess Island Wildlife Refuge, in Barataria Bay, Jefferson Parish, Louisiana, U.S.
 Queen Bess, a stack at Carnewas and Bedruthan Steps in Cornwall, England
 Mount Queen Bess, in British Columbia, Canada

See also